Mob Sister is a 2005 Hong Kong action film, directed by Wong Ching-Po and starring Annie Liu as the titular character, Karena Lam, Simon Yam, Anthony Wong and Eric Tsang.

Plot
In the macho triad world where heroes are molded from blood, brawn and brains, what place is there for a defenseless girl? The only exception to the rule is if you earn your respect as 'Ah Sou' - the big boss' wife. Ah Sou tells the extraordinary story of an innocent girl who becomes appointed successor to Hong Kong's ruling triad. This role becomes a double-edged sword for our young heroine, who is sucked into a maelstrom of vicious gang wars, hair-raising assassination attempts and ruthless power struggles and betrayals. Through numerous violent episodes and unexpected reversals, she discovers her own inner strength and re-writes the laws of the triad kingdom.

Cast
 Karena Lam as Nova
 Annie Liu as Phoebe
 Eric Tsang as Gent
 Anthony Wong Chau-sang as Whacko
 Simon Yam as Tsan Gor (Chance)
 Alex Fong Chung-sun as Fa Gor (Buddy)
 Yuen Wah as Monk Tsang-sau
 Liu Ye as Heung Tung
 Liu Kai-chi as Ah Kau
 Him Law as Little Red Cap
 Tse Kwan-ho as Nova's assistant
 Lawrence Cheng as Boss Wang

External links
 IMDb entry

Films directed by Wong Ching-po
Hong Kong action films
2000s Cantonese-language films
2005 films
2000s Hong Kong films